Fortune Ferry Company Ltd is a ferry operator in Hong Kong. It is based in North Point.

Routes

The company operates the following ferry routes:
 Tuen Mun to Tung Chung, Sha Lo Wan and Tai O 
 North Point to Kwun Tong and Kai Tak
 Central to Hung Hom
 Hong Kong Water Taxi Service

Fleet

See also
Star Ferry
Hong Kong & Kowloon Ferry
Tuen Mun Ferry Pier

External links
Fortune Ferry Company Ltd

Ferry transport in Hong Kong
Transport operators of Hong Kong